Paloma Arranz Santamarta (born 15 August 1969) is a Spanish team handball player who played for the Spanish national team. She was born in Valladolid. She competed at the 1992 Summer Olympics in Barcelona, where the Spanish team placed seventh.

References

1969 births
Living people
Sportspeople from Valladolid
Spanish female handball players
Olympic handball players of Spain
Handball players at the 1992 Summer Olympics